Pseudacraea is an Afrotropical butterfly genus in the subfamily Limenitidinae. Their placement in the tribe Limenitidini remains to be verified.

Some of these species are mimics of Acraeinae and the present genus is thus known as false acraeas.

Species
Listed alphabetically:
Pseudacraea acholica Riley, 1932
Pseudacraea annakae Knoop, 1988
Pseudacraea boisduvali (Doubleday, 1845)
Pseudacraea clarki Butler, 1892
Pseudacraea deludens Neave, 1912
Pseudacraea dolomena (Hewitson, 1865)
Pseudacraea eurytus (Linnaeus, 1758)
Pseudacraea fulvaria Butler, 1876
Pseudacraea hostilia (Drury, 1782)
Pseudacraea imerina (Hewitson, [1865])
Pseudacraea kuenowi Dewitz, 1879
Pseudacraea lucretia (Cramer, 1775)
Pseudacraea peyrierasi Collins, 1991
Pseudacraea poggei (Dewitz, 1879)
Pseudacraea rubrobasalis Aurivillius, 1903
Pseudacraea ruhama Hewitson, 1873
Pseudacraea ruwenzorica Grünberg, 1912
Pseudacraea semire (Cramer, [1779])
Pseudacraea simulator Grose-Smith, 1873
Pseudacraea striata Butler, 1876
Pseudacraea theorini Aurivillius, 1891
Pseudacraea victoris Eltringham, 1929
Pseudacraea warburgi Aurivillius, 1892

References

Ackery PR, Smith CR, and Vane-Wright RI eds. 1995. Carcasson's African Butterflies. Canberra: CSIRO.
Larsen, T. B. 2005 Butterflies of West Africa. Stenstrup, Denmark: Apollo Books.
Lees DC, Kremen C, and Raharitsimba T. 2003. "Classification, diversity and endemism of the butterflies (Papilionoidea and Hesperioidea): a revised species checklist". In: Goodman SM and Benstead JP, eds. The Natural History of Madagascar. Chicago: University of Chicago Press. 762-793.

External links

TOL
Seitz, A. Die Gross-Schmetterlinge der Erde 13: Die Afrikanischen Tagfalter. Plate XIII 46

Limenitidinae
Nymphalidae genera
Taxa named by John O. Westwood